Alexander Gross may refer to:

 Alexander Gross (pilot), involved in the Überlingen mid-air collision
 Alexander S. Gross (1917–1980), American Orthodox rabbi